Natalia Ponomarchuk (Ukrainian: Наталія Пономарчук) (born 1969) is a Ukrainian orchestral conductor. She is currently touring with the Ukrainian State Symphony Orchestra.

Ponomarchuk studied conducting at the prestigious R. Glier Conservatory, Kiev and the P. Tchaikovsky National Academy of Music, Kiev.

Ms. Ponomarchuk the title of Honored Artist of Ukraine in 2001.

References 

Women conductors (music)
Living people
1969 births
Musicians from Kyiv
Kyiv Conservatory alumni
21st-century conductors (music)